Malcolm MacDonald  was an outfielder in Major League Baseball. He played for the New York Giants in the 1902 season.

External links

1872 births
1946 deaths
Baseball players from Pennsylvania
Major League Baseball outfielders
New York Giants (NL) players
Pittsburg Coal Diggers players